The Center for the Study of Democracy, or CSD, is a European-based public policy institute dedicated to the values of democracy and market economy. The institute is an independent, non-partisan organization fostering the reform process through impact on policy and civil society.



Objectives
CSD's objectives are to: 
 Provide an enhanced institutional and policy capacity for a successful European integration process, еspecially in the area of justice and home affairs;
 Promote institutional reform and the practical implementation of democratic values in legal and economic practice;
 Monitor public attitudes and serve as a watchdog of the institutional reform process.

History
Founded in late 1989 with the official goal of building bridges between scholars and policy-makers, the institute's work over the years has grown to include policy development and has made inroads into several areas traditionally perceived as the inviolable public property, such as anti-corruption institutional reform and national security. It has had its research cited by major publications such as The New York Times and The Wall Street Journal.

References 

1989 establishments in Bulgaria
Think tanks established in 1989
Think tanks based in Bulgaria
Political and economic think tanks based in the European Union